Alsever's solution is a saline liquid used to prevent coagulation of blood. It is composed of 2.05% dextrose, 0.8% sodium citrate, 0.055% citric acid, and 0.42% sodium chloride. For usage, an equal volume of blood is gently, but thoroughly, mixed with the solution. This solution is used to study in vitro anti-inflammatory activity of crude drugs by the human red blood cell stabilization method. It is also used to preserve blood cells from other sources.

The test was invented in 1941 by the American Hematologist, John Bellows Alsever (1908–1978).

References

Solutions
Cell culture reagents
Biochemistry methods